Allmendingen may refer to:

In Germany
Allmendingen, Germany

In Switzerland
Allmendingen bei Bern, in the Canton of Bern
Allmendingen bei Thun, part of Thun, Canton of Bern